The Cerro del Quinceo (2,787 m) is an inactive volcano and the highest mountain in the municipality of Morelia, Michoacán, Mexico. The mountain is a destination for tracking, hiking and hang gliding.
Estadio Morelos home to Mexico Liga de Expansión football club Atlético Morelia is located at the foot of the mountain.

References

Quinceo
Landforms of Michoacán
North American 2000 m summits